The Morrish Medal is an Australian rules football award.

Formerly awarded to the best and fairest player in the VFL Under-19 competition (known as the Thirds prior to 1959), since 1992 the award has been given to the best player in the Victorian Statewide Under-18 competition (presently known as the NAB League)

The Morrish Medal was named in honour of Tom Morrish, a long-serving treasurer (1921–1967) of the VFL Reserve Grade. Tom was a member of the VFL Umpires Appointment Board from 1937 to 1964. He was previously a Collingwood delegate in the 2nd XVIII league and also became a Geelong delegate in the 2nd XVIII committee in 1937.

The award is voted by the field umpires in a 3–2–1 format at the conclusion of each match (as is also used in the AFL's Brownlow Medal).

Winners

VFL Thirds

VFL Under 19s

Statewide Under-18s

References
General

 

Specific

Australian rules football awards
Australian Football League
NAB League